Pat Butler (16 May 1913 – 7 March 2001) was a British boxer who won the British welterweight title in 1934.

Career
Born in Rothley, Leicestershire, Butler was a grocer's assistant before he began his professional career at the age of 18 with a points defeat to Len Wickwar  in April 1932. In his first year, he lost several fights, but improved results, including a win over Wickwar in October 1933 led to a fight for the Leicestershire Welterweight title, which he won by beating Herbie Nurse. A run of victories, including a non-title fight against British welterweight champion Harry Mason, led to a challenge for Mason's title at Granby Halls, Leicester, in December 1934, which he won with on a points decision. By this point in his career Butler had fought 79 times, losing 13 fights. He fought several non-title fights in the month that followed and after suffering a first round defeat to Harry Woodward on 10 January 1935, he resigned as British champion, saying "I cannot go on like this. I must give up boxing for a time and take a long rest before returning to the ring." He soon returned, however, but he was hampered in 1935 by injury and illness including a septic arm, an ulcer on his eyelid, and a foot injury which turned septic. He was due to challenge Gustave Eder for his European welterweight title in March 1935, but the fight was cancelled with Butler needing to take a rest from boxing.

Butler retired after defeats to Kid Davies, Jack "Kid" Berg, and Eric Dolby in late 1935. He died in 2001.

References

1913 births
2001 deaths
Welterweight boxers
Boxers from Leicester
English male boxers